El Día is an influential Uruguayan daily newspaper.

It was established in 1886 by the prominent Colorado politician José Batlle y Ordóñez. Many of the most important Uruguayan politicians and journalists wrote in its pages: Luis Batlle Berres, Lorenzo Batlle Pacheco, Manuel Flores Mora, Manuel Flores Silva, Jorge Pacheco Areco, Julio María Sanguinetti, Enrique Tarigo, Rodolfo Fattoruso, Alberto Scavarelli, Dora Isella Russell, Rafael Franzini-Batlle, Miguel A. Semino, Mario C. Fernández, Adolfo Castells Mendívil, Daniel Orzuj, Leonardo Guzmán, Horacio Ferrer, Pablo Vierci, etc., as well as the exiled Galician writer Lois Tobío Fernández.

At the beginning of the 1990s, this newspaper was experiencing serious financial troubles and ceased to exist. Its neoclassical headquarters was converted into an entertainment venue in the 2000s.

In late 2020, the newspaper was refounded as a digital journal. It still operates to this day.

References

1886 establishments in Uruguay
1993 disestablishments in Uruguay
Defunct newspapers published in Uruguay
Mass media in Montevideo
Publications established in 1886
Publications disestablished in 1993
Spanish-language newspapers
Colorado Party (Uruguay)